Major General Gerrit Nicolaas Opperman (Gert)  was a General Officer in the South African Army.

Early life
General Gert Opperman was born on 27 July 1945 in Johannesburg.

Career
He served as spokesman for the Malan family on the death of Magnus Malan.

Courses 
 Escuala de Defensa National (Joint Warfare qualification) Completed 1975
 Escuela de Estado Mayor (Command and Staff qualification) Completed 1975

Posts held 
Gen Opperman has held the following posts:

Awards
Maj Gen Opperman has received the following awards during his career:

Medals and decorations
 International Orders

References

South African Army generals
Living people
1945 births